Male and Female: A Study of the Sexes in a Changing World is a 1949 book by the American anthropologist Margaret Mead. It is a comparative study of tribal men and women on seven Pacific islands and men and women in the United States.

1949 non-fiction books
Anthropology books
Books by Margaret Mead
Gender studies books
William Morrow and Company books